This is the first edition of the event and was won by Australian Matthew Ebden defeating Tatsuma Ito in the final.

Seeds

Draw

Finals

Top half

Bottom half

References
 Main Draw
 Qualifying Draw

Melbourne Challenger - Singles
2013 Singles
2013 in Australian tennis